Veliko Plivsko Lake is a part artificial, part natural lake of Bosnia and Herzegovina. It is located in the municipality of Jajce.

See also
List of lakes in Bosnia and Herzegovina

References

Lakes of Bosnia and Herzegovina
Pliva (river)